"Know the Ledge" – originally on the soundtrack of the film Juice as "Juice (Know the Ledge)" – is a 1992 single by hip-hop duo Eric B. & Rakim. The film's theme song, also released on the duo's 1992 album Don't Sweat the Technique, it features a distinctive sample from Nat Adderley's 1968 hit "Rise, Sally, Rise".

"Know the Ledge" showcases Rakim's storytelling ability, sharing a first-person narrative of a neighborhood thug and drug dealer forced to come to grips with his violent and reckless lifestyle. Among Eric B. & Rakim's final hits as a duo, it was one of the most successful singles from the Juice soundtrack.

50 Cent told NME that the song was the one that made him want to be a rapper: "They were painting a picture of where I lived and all the moves you needed to make in order to live on the streets there. It was the law of the jungle out there."

Background
The rapper played a more active role in the song than usual:
"They let me go up in a little room and see the movie. It was funny: I was living in Manhattan, downtown on 19th street. So when I got to the crib, me and wifey, she knew I was zoning in the cab. When I got to the crib, I had my studio in a little room. I went straight up into the room and found the sample. The bass line. I took the bass line and put the regular drum sample underneath that shit. Half an hour later I had the lights off because I was in there zoning. Wifey came in; I was like, 'Turn the lights off and close the door back.' About an hour later, I came out of there with three verses, man. It was crazy."
Rakim also played live drums on the track.

Music video
The black-and-white video features Rakim rapping in the streets of Harlem, with scenes from Juice intercut.

Samples
 The main bass line is sampled from "Rise, Sally Rise" by Nat Adderley, from his 1968 release The Scavenger

Sampling and other references
 The lyric "I guess I didn't know..." (from the last line of the last verse) is sampled in the 1997 song "Busy Child" by The Crystal Method.
 Promoe, a Swedish rapper, refers to the title in the chorus of Spanish rapper Zatu's song "Al Filo", released in his album Odisea en el Lodo (2001).

In popular media
The song has been featured in...
 ...the movie Fish Tank, when Mia is dancing in a deserted flat.
 ...the third season of Prison Break, in the episode "Dirt Nap", when Sammy is shadow boxing in his room to prepare for a fight.
 ...the American Dad! episode "Don't Look a Smith Horse in the Mouth", during the SUV Dramatization.
 ...promos for the television series Archer.
 ...the video game EA Skate.
 ...the DC Shoes 2003 DC video.
 ...the film High Fidelity, during a fantasy confrontation between the characters played by John Cusack and Tim Robbins.
 ...the video game BMX XXX.
 ...the video game Mat Hoffman's Pro BMX 2.
 ...the video game NBA 2K18

Charts

Weekly charts

References

1992 singles
1992 songs
Eric B. & Rakim songs
Songs written for films
MCA Records singles